Aboubacar Soumah is a Guinean politician. He was elected to the National List in the National Assembly (Guinea). He is the President of the Opposition Guinea for Democracy and Balance Party (Guinée pour la démocratie et l'équilibre (GDE)).

References

Members of the National Assembly (Guinea)
Living people
Year of birth missing (living people)